Řezník (feminine: Řezníková) is a Czech word for 'butcher' and a surname. It may refer to:

 Řezník (rapper) (born 1986), Czech rapper
 Radim Řezník (born 1989), Czech football player

See also
 
 Reznik
 Řezníček

Czech-language surnames
Occupational surnames